Makrinou is a village and a community in the municipal unit of Makryneia, Aetolia-Acarnania, Greece. In 2011 its population was 131 for the village, and 307 for the community, which includes the villages Agia Triada, Agioi Apostoloi, Kypseli and Metaxas. It is located on a mountainside southeast of Lake Trichonida. Makrinou is 2 km southwest of Kato Makrinou, 10 km southeast of Gavalou, and 21 km northwest of Naupactus.

Population

References

External links
 Makrinou on GTP Travel Pages

Populated places in Aetolia-Acarnania